Rosenborg Ishockeyklubb Elite (RIHK) was a Norwegian ice hockey club located in Trondheim, Norway. In March, 2010, Rosenborg IHKE was promoted to the GET-ligaen, but the senior department of the club is currently inactive following a bankruptcy in 2014. Several people involved in the organization went on to found a new Trondheim-based club, Nidaros Hockey, in 2014.

History
Because of the 2012 NHL lockout, Jack Skille of the Florida Panthers signed with RIHK. Skille did not receive any wages from Rosenborg and was the first NHL player to go to Norway during the lockout.

The elite department of Rosenborg ceased operations in the summer of 2014, following a long period of economic problems.

Season-by-season results
This is a partial list of the last five seasons completed by Rosenborg. For the full season-by-season history, see List of Rosenborg IHK Ishockey seasons.

1 Rosenborg failed to renew its professional license to play in the GET-liga. The vacant spot was given to Manglerud Star.

Final roster 
As of March 2nd, 2014.

References

External links 
  
 Pointstreak

 
Ice hockey teams in Norway
Sport in Trondheim
GET-ligaen teams
1934 establishments in Norway
Ice hockey clubs established in 1934